Zoё's Place Baby Hospice is a United Kingdom based registered charity founded by Professor Jack Scarisbrick in 1995. It provides palliative and respite care for very or terminally ill babies and children up to five years old. There are currently three hostels, one each in Middlesbrough (opened in 1995), Liverpool (2004) and Coventry (2011). Patrons of the charity include multi-gold medal paralympic athlete Tanni Grey-Thompson, football manager Joe Royle and comedian Patrick Monahan. For the 2017–18 season Coventry-based English Premier League rugby club Wasps made Zoё's Place one of their key charity partners to try and raise money to run six beds out of the local hostel rather than four.

References

External links
 

Organizations established in 1995
Children's charities based in the United Kingdom
Maternity in the United Kingdom